The 2007 Horsham District Council election took place on 3 May 2007 to elect members of Horsham District Council in England. It was held on the same day as other local elections. The Conservatives won a majority on the council, gaining from no overall control.

Council composition 

Prior to the election, the composition of the council was:

After the election, the composition of the council was:

Results summary

Ward results

Billingshurst and Shipley

Bramber, Upper Beeding and Woodmancote

Broadbridge Heath

Chanctonbury

Chantry

Cowfold, Shermanbury and West Grinstead

Denne

Forest

Henfield

Holbrook East

Holbrook West

Horsham Park

Itchingfield, Slinfold and Warnham

Nuthurst

Pulborough and Coldwatham

Roffey North

Roffey South

Rudgwick

Rusper and Colgate

Southwater

Steyning

Trafalgar

References

2007 English local elections
May 2007 events in the United Kingdom
2007
2000s in West Sussex